Romance: Songs from the Heart is a 2007 album by Frank Sinatra, released posthumously, that consists of 21 tracks he recorded for Capitol Records. An alternate version of "Nice 'n' Easy" is included on the disc. The songs were remastered for digital from their original analogue versions.

Track listing

 "I've Got You Under My Skin" (Cole Porter) – 3:43
 "Time After Time" (Jule Styne, Sammy Cahn) – 3:28
 "Day by Day" (Axel Stordahl, Paul Weston, Cahn) – 2:37
 "All the Way" (Cahn, Jimmy Van Heusen) – 2:52
 "Too Marvelous for Words" (Johnny Mercer, Richard A. Whiting) – 2:28
 "My Funny Valentine" (Richard Rodgers, Lorenz Hart) – 2:32
 "Love Is Here to Stay" (George Gershwin, Ira Gershwin) – 2:40
 "I've Got a Crush on You" (G. Gershwin, I. Gershwin) – 2:17
 "Cheek to Cheek" (Irving Berlin) – 3:06
 "Try a Little Tenderness" (Jimmy Campbell, Reginald Connelly, Harry M. Woods) – 3:21
 "I Wish I Were in Love Again" (Rodgers, Hart) – 2:27
 "Angel Eyes" (Matt Dennis, Earl Brent) – 3:44
 "In the Wee Small Hours of the Morning" (Bob Hilliard, David Mann) – 3:00
 "As Time Goes By" (Herman Hupfeld) – 3:19
 "At Long Last Love" (Porter) – 2:24
 "I'll Be Seeing You" (Sammy Fain, Irving Kahal) – 2:47
 "Almost Like Being in Love" (Frederick Loewe, Alan Jay Lerner) – 2:01
 "Embraceable You" (G. Gershwin, I. Gershwin) – 3:23
 "Nice 'n' Easy" [Alternate Take Previously Unreleased] (Alan Bergman, Marilyn Bergman, Lew Spence) – 2:43
 "Where or When" – (Rodgers, Hart) – 2:32
 "If You Are But a Dream" (Moe Jaffe, Jack Fulton, Nat Bonx) – 3:54

Personnel
 Frank Sinatra – vocals
 Nelson Riddle – arranger, conductor

2007 compilation albums
Frank Sinatra compilation albums